Polyommatus (Plebicula) sagratrox, the Sierra de la Sagra blue, is a species of butterfly in the family Lycaenidae. It is endemic to Spain in the south-east of the Iberian Peninsula.

Adults are on wing from July (normally) to August. The host plant for the larvae is Anthyllis vulneraria microcephala, an endemic plant from the north-east Andalusia region of south-eastern Spain.

Synonyms 
 Plebicula sagratrox Aistleitner, 1986
 Polyommatus golgus sagratrox (Aistleitner, 1986)
 Plebicula golgus sagratrox (Aistleitner, 1986)

Ecology and distribution 
Type locality: Sierra de la Sagra in the north-east of the Province of Granada, Spain.
Distribution (see , 2013): only in four separated and small colonies: Sierra de la Sagra, Sierra de Guillimona and Sierra Seca in the north-eastern Granada province; and Sierra de la Cabrilla in north-eastern Jaén province.
 Its distribution is the most reduced of all Papilionoidea endemic species of Spain: the total occupied area by the four colonies is 0.82 km2.
 Altitude of its biotopes: 1900–2300 m (note: altitude very different from Polyommatus golgus: 2500–3200 m).
Host plant: Anthyllis vulneraria microcephala, an endemic plant from the north-east Andalusia Region, SE. Spain.

Taxonomy

References 
  (1986): Plebicula sagratrox spec. n. neue Bläulingsart aus Südost-Spanien (Lep., Lycaenidae) (Lepidoptera, Lycaenidae). Atalanta 16: 397–404.
  (2003): Polyommatus (Plebicula) sagratrox : ecología, morfología comparada de sus estadios preimaginales con los de Polyommatus (Plebicula) golgus (Hübner, 1813), taxonomía y nuevos argumentos para su validez específica (Lepidoptera, Lycaenidae). Bol. Soc. Ent. Aragonesa 33: 219–227. Full article: .
  (2007): The correct hostplant of Polyommatus golgus (Hübner, 1813): Anthyllis vulneraria pseudoarundana H. Lindb. (Lepidoptera: Lycaenidae). Atalanta 38 (1/2): 199–202, 311. Full article: .
  (2010): The correct hostplant of Polyommatus sagratrox (Aistleitner, 1986): Anthyllis vulneraria microcephala (Willk.) (Lepidoptera, Lycaenidae). Atalanta 41 (3/4): 321–322, 482. Full article: .
  (2013): Actualización de la distribución de Polyommatus sagratrox (Aistleitner, 1986), con el primer registro para la provincia de Jaén (SE. España). Notas sobre morfología, ecología y taxonomía (Lepidoptera: Lycaenidae). Bol. Soc. Andaluza Entomología 22: 94-103. Artículo completo: .
  (2009): New localities for Polyommatus sagratrox  and Pseudochazara hippolyte (Esper, 1783) in Granada province (S. Spain), with considerations on the taxonomic status of the first taxon (Lepidoptera: Lycaenidae; Satyrinae). Atalanta 40 (1/2): 185–190, 332. Full article: .
  (2009): First records of the endemic Polyommatus golgus and Agriades zullichi in Almeria province (E. Sierra Nevada, S. Spain) (Lepidoptera: Lycaenidae). Atalanta 40 (1/2): 191–192, 332. Full article: .
  (1994): Concerning the pre-imaginal stadia and taxonomy of Polyommatus (Plebicula) sagratrox (Aistleitner, 1986) (Lepidoptera, Lycaenidae). Phegea 22 (1): 23–27.

Polyommatus
Butterflies of Europe
Butterflies described in 1986